John Raines was an American lawyer and politician.

John Raines or Raynes may also refer to:

John Crawshaw Raynes, English VC recipient
John C. Raines, one of the members of the Citizens' Commission to Investigate the FBI